Banca Popolare del Frusinate S.C.p.A. (BPF) is an Italian cooperative bank based in Frosinone, Lazio. The bank was founded in 1992.

Sponsorship
The bank was a sponsor of Frosinone Calcio and Argos Volley (known as Globo Banca Popolare del Frusinate Sora). On top of sponsorship, the bank also provided scholarship to student in Frosinone.

See also

 Banca Popolare del Lazio
 Banca Popolare dell'Alto Lazio

References

External links
  

Cooperative banks of Italy
Banks established in 1992
Companies based in Lazio
Frosinone
Italian  companies established in 1992